The 2004 São Paulo municipal election took place in the city of São Paulo, with the first round taking place on 3 October and the second round taking place on 31 October 2004. Voters voted to elect the Mayor, the Vice Mayor and 55 City Councillors for the administration of the city. The result was a 2nd round victory for José Serra, of the Brazilian Social Democratic Party (PSDB), winning 3,330,179 votes and a share of 54,86% of the popular vote, defeating incumbent mayor Marta Suplicy of the Workers' Party (PT), who took 2,740,152 votes and a share of 45,14% of the popular vote.

Candidates

Candidates in runoff

Candidates failing to make runoff

Results

Mayor

City Councillors

References 

2004
October 2004 events in South America
2004 elections in Brazil